Live Nation UK is the United Kingdom subsidiary of Live Nation Entertainment. They are best known for promoting concerts, operating venues and running festivals.

As Clear Channel UK, Live Nation UK acquired the Mean Fiddler organisation and owns 51% of Academy Music Group, giving it a stake in most major music festivals and medium-sized London music venues. It has since merged with ticket sales and distribution company, Ticketmaster to become Live Nation Entertainment.

Current properties 
Promoters:

 Live Nation UK
 Metropolis Music
DF Concerts
Academy Music Group (51%)
 Cuffe & Taylor

Venues operated:

 Arts Club Liverpool (Academy Music Group)
FlyDSA Arena, Sheffield
Liverpool Guild of Students (Academy Music Group)
Motorpoint Arena, Cardiff
 O2 ABC Glasgow (Academy Music Group)
 O2 Academy Birmingham (Academy Music Group)
 O2 Academy Bournemouth (Academy Music Group)
 O2 Academy Bristol (Academy Music Group)
 O2 Academy Brixton (Academy Music Group)
 O2 Academy Glasgow (Academy Music Group)
 O2 Academy Islington (Academy Music Group)
 O2 Academy Leeds (Academy Music Group)
 O2 Academy Leicester (Academy Music Group)
 O2 Academy Liverpool (Academy Music Group)
 O2 Academy Newcastle (Academy Music Group)
 O2 Academy Oxford (Academy Music Group)
 O2 Academy Sheffield (Academy Music Group)
O2 Apollo Manchester
 O2 City Hall Newcastle (Academy Music Group)
 O2 Forum Kentish Town (Academy Music Group)
 O2 Institute Birmingham (Academy Music Group)
 O2 Ritz Manchester (Academy Music Group)
 O2 Shepherd's Bush Empire (Academy Music Group)
O2 Southampton Guildhall
 Victoria Warehouse, Manchester (Academy Music Group)
The Old Fire Station Bournemouth (Academy Music Group)

Festivals promoted:

 BluesFest (as Festival Republic)
Community Festival (as Festival Republic)
Creamfields (as Festival Republic)
Download Festival (as Festival Republic)
Latitude Festival (as Festival Republic)
 Leeds Festival (as Festival Republic)
Reading Festival (as Festival Republic)
Wireless Festival (as Festival Republic)

Former properties 
Former venues operated:

 Alexandra Theatre, Birmingham
 Apollo Victoria Theatre, London
 Bristol Hippodrome
 Dominion Theatre, London
 Edinburgh Playhouse
 Grimsby Auditorium
 Liverpool Empire Theatre
 Lyceum Theatre, London
 New Theatre, Oxford
 Palace Theatre, Manchester
 Sunderland Empire Theatre
 Wembley Arena
 West End Theatre, London

External links
Company website

Leisure companies of the United Kingdom
Glastonbury Festival
Entertainment companies established in 2005
Theatre companies in the United Kingdom
2005 establishments in the United Kingdom